Kvernberg is a Norwegian surname. Notable people with the surname include:

Jorun Marie Kvernberg (born 1979), Norwegian traditional musician and composer
Ola Kvernberg (born 1981), Norwegian jazz musician

See also
Kvernberget

Norwegian-language surnames